Angoville-au-Plain is a former commune in the Manche department in the Normandy region in northwestern France. On 1 January 2016, it was merged into the new commune of Carentan-les-Marais. It was one of the least populated communes in Manche.

It is home to a church that was used by 2 US Army Medics as an aide station during the Battle of Normandy in World War II. Robert Wright and Ken Moore of the 101st Airborne treated a mix of 80 injured American and German wounded soldiers and a child. Blood stains are still visible on the pews. Two stained glass windows commemorate the 101st Airborne Division, the first one is dedicated to the two medics of the 2nd Battalion of the 501st Parachute Infantry Regiment (101st Airborne Division). The second one honoured the American parachutists.

Population

Gallery

See also
Angoville-sur-Ay
Communes of the Manche department

References

External links
 Normandy Then and Now in Angoville-au-Plain

Former communes of Manche